Swinton, is a town in the Metropolitan Borough of Rotherham, South Yorkshire, England.  The town contains ten listed buildings that are recorded in the National Heritage List for England.  Of these, one is listed at Grade II*, the middle of the three grades, and the others are at Grade II, the lowest grade.  The listed buildings in the town and surrounding area consist of houses, a church and the remains of a chapel, a cross base, a milepost, a pottery kiln, and a former foundry.


Key

Buildings

References

Citations

Sources

 

Lists of listed buildings in South Yorkshire
Buildings and structures in the Metropolitan Borough of Rotherham